Mobarakeh (also Romanized as Mobārakeh; also known as Mobārak Shāh and Mubārakshāh) is a village in Beyza Rural District, Beyza District, Sepidan County, Fars Province, Iran. At the 2006 census, its population was 180, in 46 families.

References 

Populated places in Beyza County